Park Theatre or Park Theater may refer to:
Historic theatres
 Park Theatre (Boston), Massachusetts (1879-1990)
 Park Theatre (Brooklyn), New York (1860-1908) 
 Park Theatre (Manhattan) (the "Old Drury"), New York (1798-1848)
 Park Theatre, New York City (1911-1923, 1935-1944), built in 1903 as Majestic Theatre (Columbus Circle)

Current theatres
 Park Theatre (Estes Park, Colorado) (built 1913)
 Park Theatre (Hayward, Wisconsin) (built 1948)
 Park Theatre (London) (opened 2013)
 Park Theater, Union City, New Jersey, now Park Performing Arts Center (built 1931)
 Park Theatre (Vancouver), British Columbia (built 1940)

See also
Historic theatres 
 Abbey's Park Theatre, built as New Park Theatre, New York City (1873-1882)
 New Park Theatre (later Herald Square Theatre), New York City (1883-1914)

Current theatres
 Central Park Theatre, the name during 1931 of the New Century Theatre, Manhattan
 Devonshire Park Theatre, Eastbourne, East Sussex, UK
 Grosvenor Park Open Air Theatre, Chester, UK (founded 2010)
 Hyde Park Theatre, Austin, Texas
 Mungo Park (theatre), Allerød, Denmark
 North Park Theatre, Buffalo, New York
 Oak Park Festival Theatre, Illinois
 Park MGM, Las Vegas
 Queens Theatre in the Park, Queens, New York City
 Regent's Park Open Air Theatre, London (founded 1932)
 Theatre in the Park, community theatre in Raleigh, North Carolina

Lists of theatres